Andrzej Salamon (18 August 1936 – 8 November 2000) was a Polish freestyle swimmer. He competed in two events at the 1960 Summer Olympics.

References

External links
 

1936 births
2000 deaths
Polish male freestyle swimmers
Olympic swimmers of Poland
Swimmers at the 1960 Summer Olympics
Sportspeople from Gdynia
Universiade medalists in swimming
Universiade silver medalists for Poland
Medalists at the 1959 Summer Universiade
Medalists at the 1961 Summer Universiade